The North Melbourne Giants, previously known as the Coburg Giants, were an Australian professional basketball team based in Melbourne. The Giants competed in the National Basketball League (NBL) between 1980 and 1998, and played their home games at The Glass House.

The Coburg Giants entered the league in its second season (1980) and would change their name to the North Melbourne Giants in 1987. Under its new name, the Giants had much success, winning two championships, only to dissolve in 1998 to ultimately become a domestic association.

Honour roll

Season by season

References

External links

 
Basketball teams in Melbourne
Defunct National Basketball League (Australia) teams
Basketball teams established in 1980
Basketball teams disestablished in 1998
1980 establishments in Australia
1998 disestablishments in Australia